Dora Beregi is a former female international table tennis player from Hungary and later England and Australia.

Table tennis career
She won a silver medal at the 1938 World Table Tennis Championships with Ida Ferenczy in the doubles when representing Hungary.

Being of Jewish descent she moved to England from Europe before the war and then represented England.

She was a member of the winning England team at the 1948 World Table Tennis Championships and in addition won two more medals in the doubles with Helen Elliot and Richard Bergmann respectively.

Two more medals were won in the 1950 World Table Tennis Championships; a gold in the doubles with Helen Elliot and a bronze in the team event. She was also the winner of six English Open tournaments.

She also in the Australian championships in Brisbane Australia in 1950. later she emigrated to Australia.

Personal life
She married a Devonian Mr Devenney and became Dora Devenney.

See also
 List of England players at the World Team Table Tennis Championships
 List of table tennis players
 List of World Table Tennis Championships medalists

References

Hungarian female table tennis players
Jewish table tennis players
Year of birth missing (living people)
Living people
World Table Tennis Championships medalists
English female table tennis players
Table tennis players from Budapest